Long Sutton is a small village and civil parish in the Hart district of Hampshire, England. Neighbouring villages include Well, South Warnborough and Upton Grey.

The village includes picturesque brick and half-timbered cottages and a farmhouse dating from Tudor times. All Saints Church is the local church. Hydegate House was built in about 1561 by the Terry Family. In  of farmland stands Lord Wandsworth College, a Neo-Georgian structure built in 1915, founded as a boarding school for boys who have lost a parent. The line of the "Harrow Way," one of the oldest roads in England, runs through the village.

References

External links
 Long Sutton & Well Parish Council

Villages in Hampshire